The maniple is a liturgical vestment used primarily within the Catholic Church, and occasionally used by some Anglo-Catholic and Lutheran clergy. It is an embroidered band of silk or similar fabric that is hung over the left arm. It is only used within the context of the Mass, and it is of the same liturgical colour as the other Mass vestments.

The purpose of the maniple is uncertain, but it probably originated as a cloth the priest could use to wipe his hands and face.

Corresponds to the Orthodox epimanikia.

Current use
In its 1967 instruction, Tres abhinc annos, issued while the Tridentine Mass was still the only form used in the Roman Rite, the Sacred Congregation of Rites removed the obligation to use the maniple at Mass. Thereafter, the maniple generally fell out of liturgical use. It is still required to be worn by those who, as authorized by Pope Benedict XVI's 2007 motu proprio Summorum Pontificum, use the 1962 edition of the Roman Missal.

As Mauro Gagliardi, a consultor to the office for the Pope's liturgical ceremonies, wrote in an article on the prayers that, in the Tridentine Mass, the priest says when putting on the vestments:

Citing this remark of Gagliardi, John Zuhlsdorf has argued that, since the 1967 document did not formally abolish the maniple, only saying it was no longer required, the maniple may be used even in what since 1970 is the ordinary form of Mass. Edward McNamara, Professor of Liturgy at Regina Apostolorum University in Rome, has rejected that view:

In fact, since 1970, the Roman Missal's list of vestments to be used at Mass makes no mention of the maniple, although it does speak of another vestment, the amice, whose use is not always obligatory.

When used, the maniple is worn by a priest only when vested in a chasuble for celebrating Mass. A bishop celebrating a (Tridentine) Low Mass assumes the maniple only after the Prayers at the Foot of the Altar. The 1960 Code of Rubrics, incorporated into the 1962 Roman Missal, states that the maniple is never worn with the cope (as, for instance, in the Asperges ceremony or in giving Benediction of the Blessed Sacrament); and, if no cope is available, it allows the priest to give such blessings vested in an alb and wearing a stole, but without chasuble and maniple.

The maniple is worn also, with the dalmatic or tunicle, by the deacon and the subdeacon in a Solemn Mass, but only during the Mass itself. The maniple is not worn for other liturgical functions (e.g., the Asperges, processions) for which the dalmatic or tunicle is worn.

The maniple is a vestment not only of the Roman Rite, but also of most of the other Latin liturgical rites.

With regard to what is now the normal form of the Roman Rite, as revised in 1969, the General Instruction of the Roman Missal states: "The vestment proper to the priest celebrant at Mass and other sacred actions directly connected with Mass is, unless otherwise indicated, the chasuble, worn over the alb and stole." For the deacon it says: "The vestment proper to the deacon is the dalmatic, worn over the alb and stole. The dalmatic may, however, be omitted out of necessity or on account of a lesser degree of solemnity." In neither case is there any mention of the maniple as a vestment in use.

Historical origin
The visionary Blessed Anne Catherine Emmerich says that the Maniple was used by the ancient Jews, at the time of Christ.

Originally, the maniple was likely a piece of linen which clerics used to wipe their faces and hands and has been described by some modern commentators as being akin to a handkerchief. It appears to have been used in the Roman liturgy since at least the 6th century. The maniple can vary widely in size, shape, and degree of embroidery and ornamentation.

Common symbolic comments refer to the maniple's likeness to the rope by which Christ was led and the chains which bound his hands. It has also become known as an emblem of the tears of penance, the burden of sin, and the fatigue of the priestly office. This understanding is reflected in the vesting prayer said while putting on the maniple before Mass. Anglican commentators have described the maniple as a symbol of being a servant to the servants of God.

Alphonsus Liguori claimed: "It is well known that the maniple for the purpose of wiping away the tears that flowed from the eyes of the priest; for in former times priests wept continually during the celebration of Mass." This corresponds to the rhymed prayer that in the Tridentine Mass the priest says when putting on the maniple:

In the Papal Mass as formerly celebrated, the Pope wore a special maniple intertwined with red and gold threads, symbolizing the unity of the Eastern and Western rites of the Catholic Church.

See also
Epimanikia

References

External links

Anglican vestments
Eucharistic vestments
Lutheran vestments
Papal vestments
Roman Catholic vestments